Nosálov is a municipality and village in Mělník District in the Central Bohemian Region of the Czech Republic. It has about 200 inhabitants. The village with well preserved examples of folk architecture is protected by law as a village monument reservation.

Administrative parts
Villages of Brusné 1.díl, Libovice and Příbohy are administrative parts of Nosálov.

History
The first written mention of Nosálov is from 1324.

Sights
The village of Nosálov consists of a unique complex of original wooden cottages from the turn of the 18th and 19th centuries, so called hop houses. They are a remnant of the times when there was a hop-growing area.

The small Chapel of the Holy Trinity in the centre of Nosálov was built in 1808 and is a valuable example of a small village building of this period.

References

External links

Villages in Mělník District